Lee Jong-ho may refer to:

Lee Jong-ho (engineer), South Korean electronic engineer
Lee Jong-ho (footballer, born 1986)
Lee Jong-ho (footballer, born 1992)